The European Coalition to End Animal Experiments (ECEAE) is a European organisation actively operating in favor of animal rights and in particularly, an abolishment of testing on animals. The focus is on animal testing in cosmetics and experiments with primates. The ECEAE was created in 1990 by national and regional organisations against the testing of cosmetics on animals. 18 European animal rights organisations comprise the ECEAE. The ECEA releases publications, organizes violent free actions and campaigns and lobbies in the European Parliament, against animal testing. Their goal is to form a lobby group with the European Union and inform the public and raise public awareness.

Members
 ADDA: Spanish animal rights organisation
 Animal: Portuguese animal rights organisation
 Animalia: Finnish animal rights organisation (1961)
 Ärzte gegen Tierversuche: German animal rights organisation (1979)
 British Union for the Abolition of Vivisection
 Deutscher Tierschutzbund: German animal rights organisation
 Djurens Ratt: Swedish animal rights organisation
 Dyrevernalliansen: Norwegian animal rights organisation (2001)
 Een dier een vriend: Dutch animal rights organisation
 Forsøgsdyrenes Værn: Danish animal rights organisation (1963)
 GAIA, Belgian animal rights organisation
 Irish Anti-Vivisection Society: Irish animal rights organisation
 Lega Anti Vivisezione: Italian animal rights organisation (1977)
 LSCV: Swiss animal rights organisation (1883)
 Menschen für Tierrechte: German animal rights organisation (1982)
 One Voice: French animal rights organisation (1995)
 Prijatelji životinja: Croatian animal rights organisation
 Svoboda zvířat: Czech animal rights organisation
 Vegetarians' International Voice for Animals

Observers
 ANIMA MUNDI: Macedonian animal rights organisation
 Feniks: Serbian animal rights organisation (2009)
 Internationale Bund der Tierversuchsgegner: Austrian animal rights organisation (1968)
 WCAPS: Hungarian animal rights organisation (1990)

External links 
 Official ECEAE website

References

Animal rights organizations
International organizations based in Europe
1990 establishments in Europe
Organizations established in 1990